The 3rd Legislative Assembly of Singapore was a meeting of the Legislative Assembly of Singapore. Its first and only session started on 22 October 1963 and ended on 16 June 1965. The assembly was dissolved on 9 August 1965 and was succeeded by the 1st Parliament of Singapore.

Officeholders 

 Speaker:
 Edmund W. Barker (PAP) until 30 October 1964
 Arumugam Ponnu Rajah from 2 November 1964
 Deputy Speaker: Fong Kim Heng (PAP)
 Prime Minister: Lee Kuan Yew (PAP)
 Deputy Prime Minister: Toh Chin Chye (PAP)
 Leader of the Opposition: Lim Huan Boon (BS)
 Leader of the House: Toh Chin Chye (PAP)
 Party Whip of the People's Action Party: Chan Chee Seng

Composition

Members 
This is the list of members of the 3rd Legislative Assembly of Singapore elected in the 1963 general election.

By-elections

References 

Government of Singapore